Martin Nwokocha Offiah MBE (  (original pronunciation),   (commonly used)); born 29 December 1965) is an English former professional rugby league and rugby union footballer who played in the 1980s, 1990s and 2000s. Offiah was inducted into the Rugby League Hall of Fame in 2013. He scored over 500 tries during his rugby league career, making him the third-highest try scorer (and top try-scoring English player) of all time, and now features in a statue of great rugby league players outside Wembley Stadium.

He was a Great Britain and England national representative winger, and due to his running speed he was nicknamed "Chariots" Offiah after the film Chariots of Fire while playing amateur rugby union at Rosslyn Park. Offiah played for English rugby league clubs Widnes, Wigan, London Broncos and Salford City Reds, and in Australia for Sydney's Eastern Suburbs and St. George clubs.

It is believed that the England rugby anthem "Swing Low, Sweet Chariot" was first sung at Twickenham while Offiah was playing in the Middlesex Sevens in 1987.

Since retiring Offiah has appeared on several reality TV shows.

Background
Offiah was born in Hackney, London, England to Nigerian parents of Igbo origin, and attended Woolverstone Hall School near Ipswich, Suffolk, where he represented the school at fencing and played rugby union and cricket. He played cricket for the Essex 2nd XI but soon realised his main talent was for rugby union.

He first played club-level rugby union for Ipswich RFC and Rosslyn Park. After starring on the rugby sevens circuit and for the Barbarians, there was talk of an England future for Offiah.

Professional playing career

Widnes
Offiah was spotted by Widnes coach Doug Laughton playing in the Middlesex Sevens, and was signed by the club to play rugby league for the 1987–88 season. Alex Murphy had been interested in acquiring Offiah from rugby union, but the board of directors at St. Helens infamously referred to Offiah as an "uncoordinated clown" and the interest was not followed up with action. Within months, he became the most talked-about winger since Billy Boston for his lightning speed and try-scoring; at Widnes he forged a reputation as a devastating winger, helping the team win both the Championship and Premiership. He ended his début season with 42 tries, making him the league's top try scorer, also breaking the club record held by Frank Myler for most tries scored in a season. He received the Man of Steel award for his efforts.

He was also rewarded with a place in the 1988 Great Britain Lions tour of Australasia, where he played in all three Tests of the Ashes series which was lost to Australia. While on tour with the Lions, Offiah took part in a 100-metre match race at Wentworth Park in Sydney against Australian flyers Dale Shearer and John Ferguson (Ferguson replaced Greg Alexander who was forced to withdraw through injury). Confirming his standing as the fastest player in rugby league, Offiah easily won the race from Shearer and Ferguson.

In the 1988–89 season, Widnes won the Championship and Premiership for the second successive year, and Offiah was once again the league's top try scorer with 58 tries in 41 games. He played in Widnes' 6–12 defeat by Wigan in the 1988–89 John Player Special Trophy final Burnden Park in Bolton.

He then spent the summer in Australia playing for Eastern Suburbs. He scored a try on his NSWRL début against Western Suburbs, and went on to score nine tries in 12 games for the club before returning to Widnes a feat only surpassed by Steven Nolan.

During the 1989–90 season, Offiah played for Widnes on the wing in their 1989 World Club Challenge victory against the visiting Canberra Raiders. Offiah scored a try in Widnes' 24–18 victory over Salford in the 1990 Lancashire Cup final.

In 1991, Offiah had a second spell in Australia, this time playing for St George Dragons. He scored 11 tries in 14 games, including a hat trick against his former club, Eastern Suburbs.

Over four seasons at Widnes Offiah scored a total of 181 tries in 145 games.

Wigan
Offiah joined Wigan in January 1992 for a world record fee of £440,000 (based on increases in average earnings, this would be approximately £900,300 in 2013). This figure remained a record for a total cash transfer until Wigan beat their own record, paying £450,000 for Stuart Fielden from the Bradford Bulls in 2006.

Playing in his regular left wing position, Offiah formed a devastating partnership with Gene Miles in his first season at Wigan scoring 30 tries in just 15 games including setting a new club record of ten in a single match against Leeds in the Premiership semi-final in May.

Offiah played in Wigan's 5–4 victory over St Helens in the 1992 RFL Lancashire Cup Final at Knowsley Road.

He played in a 15–8 victory over Bradford Northern in the 1992–93 Regal Trophy Final at Elland Road, played in the 2–33 defeat by Castleford in the 1993–94 Regal Trophy Final at Headingley,  and scored a try in the 40–10 victory over Warrington in the 1994–95 Regal Trophy Final at Alfred McAlpine Stadium, and played in the 25–16 victory over St Helens in the 1995–96 Regal Trophy Final.

He was selected to go on the 1992 Great Britain Lions tour of Australia and New Zealand. Before the match against the Parramatta Eels, Offiah had a 100-metre race against Eels winger Lee Oudenryn. Offiah appeared to slip slightly at the start and Oudenryn won by half a yard, though rumours quickly spread that Offiah had tanked to allow Lions teammates to collect after they had allegedly backed the bookies' outsider Oudenryn to win.

During the 1992–93 season Offiah played on the wing for defending RFL champions Wigan in the 1992 World Club Challenge against the visiting Brisbane Broncos. A week before the WCC, Offiah had played on the wing for Great Britain in the World Cup Final against Australia at Wembley in front of an international rugby league record crowd of 73,631 fans.

Offiah played in four Challenge Cup wins, five Championship teams, three Regal Trophy wins and one Lancashire County Cup victory. He was twice man of the match winning the Lance Todd Trophy at Wembley. His 90-metre solo try in the 1994 Challenge Cup Final win over Leeds is remembered as one of the finest ever seen in a final, but he made a habit of such runs during his career, scoring a similar try just weeks before against Castleford. After the 1993–94 season Offiah travelled with defending champions Wigan to Brisbane, playing on the wing in their 1994 World Club Challenge victory over Australian premiers, the Brisbane Broncos.

In 1995, Offiah's life story, a 30-minute documentary, was produced and directed by Pogus Caesar for Carlton TV UK as part of the Respect series. Offiah was selected to play for England in the 1995 World Cup Final on the wing, but Australia won the match and retained the Cup.

Offiah jointly holds the record for the most tries scored in a match for the England national rugby league team.

Offiah made a total of 158 appearances for Wigan with another single appearance as a substitute. He scored more than a try a game, crossing the line 186 times. He also managed a goal and three drop goals, thus scoring a grand total of 749 points for the club. He left the club in 1996 to return to the capital to play for London Broncos, but sent an open letter to the Wigan Observer thanking fans and the club for his time there.

Later career and return to rugby union
When rugby league made the switch to summer rugby in 1996, Offiah played in only ten games before moving to the London Broncos. He played for London in their 1999 Challenge Cup Final defeat against Leeds. In total, he scored 24 tries in 48 games for the club.

In 1996, after rugby union had officially allowed professionalism, Offiah signed for Bedford Blues, and had a brief spell there while also playing for the London Broncos. He played 14 games for the club, scoring 10 tries.

After the London Broncos he moved to Salford City Reds for the 2000 Super League V, staying for two seasons, playing 45 games and scoring 23 tries.

He finished his career in 2001–02 playing rugby union for London Wasps, who were coached by his former Wigan team-mate Shaun Edwards. He played in eight games for the club, scoring five tries.

He was awarded an MBE in the 1997 New Year Honours.

Career statistics

Club

Post-playing career
In 2004, Offiah was one of the celebrities who took part in the first series of the BBC One show Strictly Come Dancing, reaching fourth place with his partner Erin Boag. In 2005, alongside Natasha Kaplinsky, he hosted the one-off special, Strictly African Dancing.

In 2006 he appeared on a Reality TV special of The Weakest Link, winning £10,050 and splitting the winnings with Danniella Westbrook. Offiah won Celebrity come Dine With Me in 2011 which was a Rugby World Cup special. Offiah beat Victor Ubogo, Kieran Bracken and Gareth Chilcott. Offiah has also appeared on BBC quiz show Pointless, firstly with Chris Kamara in 2012, where they were eliminated in the first round, the second time in 2013 with cricketer Philip Tufnell where they won the cash prize by getting a Pointless answer in the final round. Offiah donated his £1,250 prize to the Joining Jack Charity. In 2014, he was a contestant on Splash!, and was the fourth to be eliminated from the competition. In 2015, he appeared with his son Tyler on Big Star's Little Star where they won £11,000 for charity. In 2015, Offiah took part on All Star Mr & Mrs with his partner Virginia.

Offiah worked as a pundit for Sky Sports rugby from 2008 until 2013. He was a regular studio guest during the 2008 Rugby League World Cup, and presented a weekly Super League round up on Sky Sports News. He has worked as an agent for several rugby players including Richie Myler and Kyle Eastmond. Offiah has also appeared several times on the TV show A Question Of Sport. In January 2018, Offiah participated in And They're Off! in aid of Sport Relief.

Offiah is part of the Rugby League Monument that sits outside Wembley Stadium, his bronze likeness depicting his try celebration from the 1994 Challenge Cup final.

Since 2019, Offiah has been a brand ambassador for the electric vehicle charging infrastructure company Connected Kerb. His passion for electric vehicles began when he received a lift from former England rugby union player and World Cup winner Andy Gomersal in 2016. In December 2021, he facilitated a partnership between Connected Kerb and one of his former clubs London Broncos in which the Plough Lane outfit would wear the EV company’s logo on their kit throughout 2022.

Personal life
Offiah has two sons, Tyler (born 29 June 2006) and Phoenix (born 24 September 2009) with his wife, model and photographer Virginia Offiah and lives in Ealing, West London. He is the uncle of professional footballer Odel Offiah.

Notes

References

Books

External links

(archived by web.archive.org) Martin Offiah Official Website
Statistics at wigan.rlfans.com
Martin Offiah – featured on 100 Great Black Britons
(archived by web.archive.org) Wasps profile
(archived by web.archive.org) Crooks in trouble
(archived by web.archive.org) When Britain defeated the Aussies

1965 births
Living people
Alumni of Liverpool John Moores University
Bedford Blues players
Black British sportsmen
England national rugby league team players
English people of Nigerian descent
English rugby league commentators
English rugby league players
English rugby union players
Great Britain national rugby league team players
Lance Todd Trophy winners
London Broncos players
Members of the Order of the British Empire
People from Hackney Central
Rosslyn Park F.C. players
Rugby league players from Greater London
Rugby league wingers
Rugby union players from Hackney
Salford Red Devils players
St. George Dragons players
Sydney Roosters players
Wasps RFC players
Widnes Vikings players
Wigan Warriors players